Gauhati Town Club Ground or Judges Field is a multi-purpose ground in Guwahati, Assam. The ground is mainly used for organizing matches of football and cricket. The ground is the home of Gauhati Town Club, one of the oldest and premier sports club in the north-east.

The ground has hosted four Ranji Trophy matches  in 1956 when Assam cricket team played against Orissa cricket team. The ground hosted three more Ranji Trophy matches from 1960 to 1961.

References

External links 

 cricketarchive
 cricinfo

Cricket grounds in Assam
Football venues in Assam
Athletics (track and field) venues in India
Sports venues in Guwahati
Defunct cricket grounds in India
1908 establishments in India
Sports venues completed in 1908
20th-century architecture in India